The East Dunbartonshire Council election of 2022 was held on 5 May 2022, the same day as the 31 other Scottish local government elections. Each ward elected three or four councillors using the single transferable vote system, a form of proportional representation used since the 2007 election and according to the Local Governance (Scotland) Act 2004.

The election saw the SNP remain as the largest group, increasing their representation by 1 seat to 8. The Lib Dems remained steady on 6, moving into second place, although former Depute Provost Gary Pews, who had succeeded the Conservative's Alan Brown as Provost following the latter's death in December 2021, lost his seat. Labour doubled their representation to 4 seats, moving into third place, while the Conservatives fell back to fourth place on 3. The Independent councillor Duncan Cumming retained his seat.

Election result

Note: "Votes" are the first preference votes. The net gain/loss and percentage changes relate to the result of the previous Scottish local elections on 3 May 2012. This may differ from other published sources showing gain/loss relative to seats held at dissolution of Scotland's councils.

Ward results

Milngavie
2017: 1 x Liberal Democrat, 1 x SNP, 1 x Conservative
2022: 1 x Liberal Democrat, 1 x SNP, 1 x Conservative
2017-2022 Change: No Change

Bearsden North
2017: 1 x Independent, 1 x Lib Dem, 1 x Conservative
2022: 1 x Independent, 1 x Lib Dem, 1 x SNP
2017-2022 Change: 1 x SNP gain from Conservative

Bearsden South
2017: 1 x Liberal Democrat, 1 x SNP, 1 x Conservative
2022: 1 x Liberal Democrat, 1 x SNP, 1 x Conservative 
2017-2022: No Change

Bishopbriggs North and Campsie
2017: 2 x SNP, 1 x Liberal Democrat, 1 x Conservative 
2022: 2 x SNP, 1 xLabour, 1 x Conservative
2017-2022 Change: 1x Labour gain from Lib Dem

Bishopbriggs South
2017: 1 x Labour, 1 x SNP, 1 x Conservative
2022: 1 x Labour, 1 x SNP, 1 x Liberal Democrat
2007-2012 Change: 1x Lib Dem gain from Conservative

Lenzie & Kirkintilloch South
2017: 1 x Liberal Democrat, 1 x SNP, 1 x Conservative
2022: 1 x Liberal Democrat, 1 x SNP, 1 x Labour
2017-2022 Change: 1 x Labour gain from Conservative

Kirkintilloch East & North & Twechar
2017: 1 x Labour, 1 x SNP, 1 x Liberal Democrat
2022: 1 x Labour, 1 x SNP, 1 x Liberal Democrat
2017-2022 Change: No Change

Aftermath
On 19 May 2022, a new SNP administration took office, with Cllr Gordan Low elected as Leader and Cllr Calum Smith appointed as Depute. Cllr Gillian Renwick was appointed as the first SNP Provost of East Dunbartonshire, and the first to represent a Kirkintilloch seat. Labour's Cllr Colette McDiarmid was elected as Depute Provost.

References 

2022
East Dunbartonshire
21st century in East Dunbartonshire